Bhatni may refer to:

 Bhatni, Bhopal, a village in Madhya Pradesh, India
 Bhatni Bazar, a village in Uttar Pradesh, India